The Meeting of the Great Rivers Scenic Route extends for  in southwestern Illinois, travelling through the floodplain of the Mississippi and Illinois Rivers. The route has been officially designated as a National Scenic Byway by the Federal Highway Administration. The route coincides with a portion of the Great River Road.

Route description
The north end of the route is at Pere Marquette State Park, located at the confluence of the Mississippi and Illinois Rivers. The south end of the route is at the Lewis and Clark State Historic Site, located near the confluence of the Mississippi and Missouri Rivers. The cities and villages of Grafton, Chautauqua, Elsah, Alton, East Alton, Wood River and Hartford are located along the route.

The Sam Vadalabene Bike Trail parallels the route between Pere Marquette State Park and Alton. The Confluence Bike Trail parallels the route from Alton south to Hartford.

History
The Meeting of the Great Rivers Scenic Route was designated as an Illinois State Scenic Byway on  June 8, 1998. It was later added to the National Scenic Byway program on  June 15, 2000, with an addition that  extended the existing byway from East Alton south to New Poag Road. In May 2007, the Illinois Bureau of Tourism announced that the route was officially chosen as one of the "Seven Wonders of Illinois".

References

External links

Great River Road
Illinois River
Mississippi River
Missouri River
National Scenic Byways
State highways in Illinois
Tourist attractions in Jersey County, Illinois
Tourist attractions in Madison County, Illinois
1998 establishments in Illinois